The 1934 Paris–Roubaix was the 35th edition of the Paris–Roubaix, a classic one-day cycle race in France. The single day event was held on 1 April 1934 and stretched  from Paris to its end in a velodrome in Roubaix The winner was Gaston Rebry from Belgium, after the original victor, French champion Roger Lapébie, was disqualified for finishing the race on a spectator's bicycle following a puncture.

Results

References

Paris–Roubaix
Paris–Roubaix
Paris–Roubaix
Paris–Roubaix